Salvador Maria Louro Vassalo Santos (born 1 March 1993) is a Portuguese rugby union player who plays as a flanker. 

He plays for Cascais Rugby since he was 7 years old, and joined the first category in 2011/12. 

He has 27 caps for Portugal, with 6 tries scored, 30 points on aggregate. He had his debut at the 29-20 win over Namibia, at 22 November 2014, in Lisbon, in a tour, aged 21 years old, in a game where he played as a substitute. He was the captain of the "Lobos".

References

External links
Salvador Vassalo International Statistics

1993 births
Living people
Portuguese rugby union players
Portugal international rugby union players
Rugby union flankers